Pipamperone (INN, USAN, BAN), also known as carpiperone and floropipamide or fluoropipamide, and as floropipamide hydrochloride (JAN), is a typical antipsychotic of the butyrophenone family used in the treatment of schizophrenia and as a sleep aid for depression. It is or has been marketed under brand names including Dipiperon, Dipiperal, Piperonil, Piperonyl, and Propitan. Pipamperone was discovered at Janssen Pharmaceutica in 1961, and entered clinical trials in the United States in 1963.

Pharmacology

Pipamperone acts as an antagonist of the 5-HT2A, 5-HT2B, 5-HT2C D2, D3, D4, α1-adrenergic, and α2-adrenergic receptors. It shows much higher affinity for the 5-HT2A and D4 receptors over the D2 receptor (15-fold in the case of the D4 receptor, and even higher in the case of the 5-HT2A receptor), being regarded as "highly selective" for the former two sites at low doses. Pipamperone has low and likely insignificant affinity for the H1 and mACh receptors, as well as for other serotonin and dopamine receptors.

Pipamperone is considered to have been a forerunner to the atypical antipsychotics, if not an atypical antipsychotic itself, due to its prominent serotonin antagonism. It is also used to normalise mood and sleep patterns and has antianxiety effects in neurotic patients.

Antidepressant effects
Low-dose pipamperone (5 mg twice daily) has been found to accelerate and enhance the antidepressant effect of citalopram (40 mg once daily), in a combination (citalopram/pipamperone) referred to as PipCit (code name PNB-01).

See also 
 Clozapine
 Melperone
 Pimozide
 Piritramide
 Risperidone

References 

5-HT2A antagonists
5-HT2B antagonists
5-HT2C antagonists
Alpha-1 blockers
Alpha-2 blockers
Carboxamides
Belgian inventions
Butyrophenone antipsychotics
D2 antagonists
D3 antagonists
D4 antagonists
Janssen Pharmaceutica
Fluoroarenes
Piperidines
Typical antipsychotics